The Department of Home and Confidential or Home Department serves as the ministry of the interior of the Government of Uttar Pradesh. Responsible for the maintenance of law and order in the state of Uttar Pradesh, the department makes decisions regarding the peace of the state and enforcement of law and order and is responsible for the functioning of the state police. The department also prepares the state police's budget and—subject to the legislature's approval—releases funds. The department acts the cadre controlling authority of the Uttar Pradesh cadre of Indian Police Service (IPS) and Provincial Police Service (PPS). The chief minister serves as the departmental minister for the department, whereas the Additional Chief Secretary (Home)—an Indian Administrative Service (IAS) officer—acts as the administrative head of the department.

Functions 
The Department of Home and Confidential is mainly responsible for making decisions regarding the peace of the state and enforcement of law and policy related to the functioning of the Uttar Pradesh Police, by preparing its budget and—subject to approval from the Uttar Pradesh Legislative Assembly—releasing funds to it. The department answers questions related to law and order in the legislative assembly and the legislative council; addresses the issues related to the affairs of the Uttar Pradesh Human Rights Commission and the National Human Rights Commission. The department also coordinates with the Ministry of Home Affairs in matters related police and law and order.

The department ensures the security arrangements of citizens, very important persons, very very important persons and state guests. The Uttar Pradesh Police Housing Corporation—an autonomous body—is set up under the department to fulfil the housing and building requirements of the Uttar Pradesh Police. The department also acts the cadre controlling authority of the Indian Police Service and the Provincial Police Service.

Important officials

Headquarters 
The Chief Minister of Uttar Pradesh, Yogi Adityanath, is the minister responsible for the Department of Home and Confidential.

The department's administration is headed by an Additional Chief Secretary, an IAS officer, who is assisted by four secretaries, one of whom is an inspector general-rank Indian Police Service, ten special secretaries, and twelve deputy/under secretaries.

Head of department level 
At the head of department level, apart from Director General of Police, Director General (Prosecution), Director General (CB-CID), Director General (Fire Service), Director General (Technical Services), Director General (Training Services) and Director General (Prisons) are appointed. The department also has an attached office in Uttar Pradesh Police Housing Corporation, which acts an autonomous organisation and was set up to accomplish the housing and building requirements of Uttar Pradesh Police.

References 

Law enforcement agencies in Asia
Home and Confidential
Internal affairs ministries